Carlos Buxton Opoku (born 6 September 1998) is a Ghanaian football player who currently plays for Greek club Fostiras. He also holds Italian citizenship.

Club career
He made his Serie C debut for Paganese on 26 August 2017 in a game against Bisceglie.

References

External links

 Carlos Buxton Opoku 2019-20 stats at CFA

1998 births
Sportspeople from the Province of Verona
Italian people of Ghanaian descent
Italian sportspeople of African descent
Living people
Ghanaian footballers
Paganese Calcio 1926 players
Ethnikos Latsion FC players
Serie C players
Serie D players
Association football forwards
Expatriate footballers in Cyprus
Footballers from Veneto